Taylor Ryan Charters (born 2 October 2001) is an English professional footballer who plays as a midfielder for Carlisle United.

Career
Born in Whitehaven, Charters signed a two-year contract with Carlisle United, his first professional contract, following a scholarship period at the club. He joined Northern Premier League Division One North West side Workington on a month-long loan in November 2019, and made 3 appearances for the club in all competitions. Charters made his senior debut for Carlisle on 1 January 2020 as a second-half substitute for Mohammed Sagaf in a 4–1 defeat away to Crewe Alexandra. He made a further 8 appearances for Carlisle in all competitions across the 2019–20 season, with Charters praised for his performances.

On 14 January 2022, he joined National League North club Gateshead on a month-long loan. This loan was later extended to the end of the season as Charters was part of the Gateshead squad that won the National League North title. 

In May 2022, Charters signed a new one-year deal with Carlisle.

Career statistics

References

External links
 

2001 births
Living people
Sportspeople from Whitehaven
English footballers
Association football midfielders
Carlisle United F.C. players
Workington A.F.C. players
Gateshead F.C. players
English Football League players
National League (English football) players
Northern Premier League players
Footballers from Cumbria